Herbert Chevell (1888-1960) was an Australian rugby league footballer who played in the 1900s and 1910s.

Playing career
Chevell was a foundation player with the Newtown club in 1908, the very first year of the NSWRFL. He played three seasons at the club before retiring in 1910.  

Chevell played 4 games for Newtown in 1910 but did not play in the grand final against South Sydney which Newtown won despite drawing 4–4 at full time.  Newtown were awarded the premiership due to the fact that they finished minor premiers. Chevell was also a noted Australian Rules player and a cricketer.

Death
Chevell died on 3 September 1960 in Newtown, New South Wales aged 72.

References

1888 births
1960 deaths
Australian rugby league players
Newtown Jets players
Rugby league players from Sydney
Rugby league second-rows